Tremolo is the seventh studio album by Blue Rodeo.

On this album, the band attempted to maintain a more immediate vibe than on 1995's Nowhere to Here, which had been labelled as overly mannered by critics. To that end, songs were not brought to the whole band until the day of recording, so that the band's performance would retain a spontaneous flair.

Track listing

Chart performance

Certifications

References

1997 albums
Blue Rodeo albums